Brandon Goodwin (born October 2, 1995) is an American professional basketball player who last played for the Cleveland Cavaliers of the National Basketball Association (NBA). He played college basketball for Florida Gulf Coast University. A transfer from the University of Central Florida (UCF), Goodwin was named the 2018 ASUN Conference Player of the Year.

College career
Goodwin, a 6’0” point guard, committed to UCF from Norcross High School. He played for the Knights in the 2013–14 and 2014–15 seasons. He left UCF after being caught taking (though later returning) a bike on campus the summer after his freshman year.

Goodwin landed at Florida Gulf Coast (FGCU) after leaving UCF. After sitting out a season as a transfer, he averaged 18.5 points, 4.5 rebounds and 4.1 assists per game and was named ASUN Conference Newcomer of the Year. He then led the Eagles to an NCAA Tournament berth after earning Atlantic Sun tournament MVP honors.

Following his junior season, Goodwin declared for the 2017 NBA draft without signing with an agent, ultimately deciding to return to FGCU for his senior year.

In his senior year, Goodwin led the Eagles to a regular season Atlantic Sun championship and was named first-team All-Atlantic Sun and the Atlantic Sun Player of the Year. He averaged 18.6 points, 5.5 rebounds, 4.8 assists and 1.4 steals per game as a senior.

Professional career

Memphis Hustle (2018)
After going undrafted in the 2018 NBA draft, Goodwin signed with the Memphis Grizzlies for the 2018 NBA Summer League. On September 4, he joined the Grizzlies for training camp. He was waived on October 13, as one of the final roster cuts before opening night. Goodwin was subsequently added to the roster of the Grizzlies’ NBA G League affiliate, the Memphis Hustle. In nine appearances with the Hustle, Goodwin averaged 23.4 points, 5.3 rebounds and 4 assists per game.

Denver Nuggets (2018–2019)
On November 29, 2018, Goodwin was signed by the Denver Nuggets. The Nuggets were granted an injury hardship relief exception from the NBA, allowing them to add Goodwin to their otherwise full roster. He was waived on December 10, without appearing in any games.

On December 13, 2018, the Memphis Hustle announced that Goodwin had returned to their team. Three days later the Nuggets re-signed Goodwin to a two-way contract.

Atlanta Hawks (2019–2021)

On August 6, 2019, Goodwin signed a two-way contract with the Atlanta Hawks. On February 12, 2020, the Atlanta Hawks announced that they had re-signed Goodwin to a multi-year contract. Goodwin missed the 2021 NBA playoffs due to a respiratory condition.

Westchester Knicks (2021)
On October 14, Goodwin was signed by the New York Knicks, who waived him the next day. In October 2021, he joined the Westchester Knicks as an affiliate player. He averaged 15.3 points, 5.1 rebounds, 7.0 assists and 1.9 steals per game.

Cleveland Cavaliers (2021–2022)
On December 31, 2021, Goodwin signed a 10-day contract with the Cleveland Cavaliers via the hardship exemption. On January 9, 2022, his deal was converted to a two-way contract.

Career statistics

NBA

Regular season

|-
| style="text-align:left;"|
| style="text-align:left;"|Denver
| 16 || 0 || 3.6 || .261 || .333 || .818 || .2 || .9 || .0 || .0 || 1.4
|-
| style="text-align:left;"|
| style="text-align:left;"|Atlanta
| 34 || 1 || 12.6 || .400 || .299 || .933 || 2.1 || 1.5 || .4 || .1 || 6.1
|-
| style="text-align:left;"|
| style="text-align:left;"|Atlanta
| 47 || 5 || 13.2 || .377 || .311 || .651 || 1.5 || 2.0 || .4 || .0 || 4.9
|-
| style="text-align:left;"|
| style="text-align:left;"|Cleveland
| 36 || 5 || 13.9 || .416 || .345 || .632 || 1.9 || 2.5 || .7 || .0 || 4.8
|- class="sortbottom"
| style="text-align:center;" colspan="2"| Career
| 133 || 11 || 12.1 || .390 || .315 || .730 || 1.6 || 1.9 || .4 || .0 || 4.7

References

External links

 Florida Gulf Coast Eagles bio
 UCF Knights bio

1995 births
Living people
American men's basketball players
Atlanta Hawks players
Basketball players from Georgia (U.S. state)
Cleveland Cavaliers players
Cleveland Charge players
College Park Skyhawks players
Denver Nuggets players
Florida Gulf Coast Eagles men's basketball players
Iowa Wolves players
Memphis Hustle players
Norcross High School alumni
People from Norcross, Georgia
Point guards
Sportspeople from the Atlanta metropolitan area
UCF Knights men's basketball players
Undrafted National Basketball Association players
Westchester Knicks players